In algebraic geometry, semistable reduction theorems state that, given a proper flat morphism , there exists a morphism  (called base change) such that  is semistable (i.e., the singularities are mild in some sense). Precise formulations depend on the specific versions of the theorem.

The imprortant semistable reduction theorem for algebraic curves was first proved by Deligne and Mumford. The proof proceeds by showing that the curve has semistable reduction if and only if its Jacobian variety (which is an Abelian variety) has semistable reduction; one then applies the theorem for Abelian varieties above.

References

Further reading 
The Stacks Project Chapter 55: Semistable Reduction: Introduction, https://stacks.math.columbia.edu/tag/0C2Q

Algebraic geometry